The Palmer Depot is a historic train station at South Valley Way and Evergreen Avenue in Palmer, Alaska. It is a large three-section single story frame structure, built in 1935 to provide transportation services to the newly established Matanuska Valley Colony. The next section, with a lower profile than the warehouse, housed baggage facilities, a passenger waiting area, and living quarters for the station agent. The third section, the smallest of the three, houses the former ticketing office. The building now houses a community center.

The building was listed on the National Register of Historic Places in 1978 and was added as a contributing property to Matanuska Colony Community Center in 1991.

See also
National Register of Historic Places listings in Matanuska-Susitna Borough, Alaska

References

Railway stations on the National Register of Historic Places in Alaska
Railway stations in the United States opened in 1935
Buildings and structures in Matanuska-Susitna Borough, Alaska
Community centers in the United States
Former Alaska Railroad stations
Buildings and structures on the National Register of Historic Places in Matanuska-Susitna Borough, Alaska
Individually listed contributing properties to historic districts on the National Register in Alaska
Repurposed railway stations in the United States